Sir George Campbell, DCL (1824 – 18 February 1892) was a Scottish Liberal Party politician and Indian administrator.

Campbell was born in 1824, the eldest son of Sir George Campbell, of Edenwood, whose brother became the 1st Baron Campbell. He was educated at Hamilton Academy and embarked for India.

From 1871 to 1874 he was Lieutenant-Governor of Bengal. During his tenure the Pabna Disturbances occurred. With his proclamation on 4 July 1873 during the Pabna Peasant Uprisings, guaranteeing government support of peasants against excessive zamindar demands he ensured that the prostest remained peaceful, at the same time antagonising the landlords and his namesake George Campbell, 8th Duke of Argyll at that time Secretary of State for India. He was Member of Parliament (MP) for Kirkcaldy Burghs from 1875 to 1892.

Campbell married, in 1853, Laetitia Maria Vibart, daughter of John Gowan Vibart, of the Bengal civil service, and left several children.
Lady Campbell died in London 21 October 1901, aged 68. 

Their eldest son, Major George Campbell (ca. 1861–1902), died while serving with the 8th King's Regiment in the Second Boer War in South Africa.

References

Further reading

External links 
 

1824 births
1892 deaths
People educated at Hamilton Academy
Scottish Liberal Party MPs
UK MPs 1874–1880
UK MPs 1880–1885
UK MPs 1885–1886
UK MPs 1886–1892
Knights Commander of the Order of the Star of India
Lieutenant-governors of Bengal
Scottish knights
Scottish bankers
Members of the Parliament of the United Kingdom for Fife constituencies
19th-century Scottish politicians
19th-century Scottish businesspeople